The Freyberg Mountains are a group of mountains in Victoria Land, Antarctica, bounded by Rennick Glacier, Bowers Mountains, Black Glacier, and Evans Neve. Named for New Zealand's most famous General, Lord Bernard Freyberg, by the Northern Party of New Zealand Geological Survey Antarctic Expedition (NZGSAE), 1963-64. This mountain group includes the Alamein Range. These topographical features all lie situated on the Pennell Coast, a portion of Antarctica lying between Cape Williams and Cape Adare.

Key mountains 
 Mount Baldwin is a mountain 5 nautical miles (9 km) southeast of Smiths Bench, in the Freyberg Mountains. Named by Advisory Committee on Antarctic Names (US-ACAN) for T.T. Baldwin, transport specialist, a member of the United States Antarctic Research Program (USARP) Victoria Land Traverse Party which surveyed this area in 1959-60.
 Buttress Peak is a peak at the east end of the central ridge of Gallipoli Heights. The descriptive name was suggested by P.J. Oliver, New Zealand Antarctic Research Program (NZARP) geologist who studied the peak, 1981-82.
 Mount Jackman is a mountain, 1,920 m, standing 9 miles (14 km) south of Mount Baldwin. Named by US-ACAN for Warren A. Jackman, photographer, a member of the USARP Victoria Land Traverse Party which surveyed this area in 1959-60.
 Mount Strandtmann is a mountain 3 nautical miles (6 km) north of Smiths Bench. Mapped by United States Geological Survey (USGS) from surveys and U.S. Navy air photos, 1960-64. Named by US-ACAN for Russell W. Strandtmann, biologist at McMurdo Station, summers 1966-67 and 1967-68.

Features
Geographical features of Freyberg Mountains include:

Alamein Range

Gallipoli Heights

Russet Hills

Salamander Range

Other features

 Black Stump
 Cameron Nunataks
 Coates Rocks
 Lookout Nunatak
 Mello Nunatak
 Moawhango Névé
 Mount Massell
 Salvador Nunatak
 Schumann Nunatak
 Smiths Bench

References

Mountain ranges of Victoria Land
Pennell Coast